The Andrew Cunningham Farm is located near the Cass County, Illinois city of Virginia. The Cunningham Farm is listed on the National Register of Historic Places, one of only two such sites in Cass County. The other site, in Beardstown, is the Beardstown Grand Opera House. The farm is about two and a half miles east of Virginia. It has been listed on the Register since May 12, 1975.

History
The home, called Allandale or Allendale, was constructed in 1852 by Andrew Cunningham.

Notes

External links
 Allandale, Virginia, Cass County, IL — photos, data, and description pages from the Historic American Buildings Survey at the Library of Congress
 Illinois SP Cunningham, Andrew, Farm — National Register of Historic Places forms and documentation in the National Archives Catalog

Buildings and structures in Cass County, Illinois
Farms on the National Register of Historic Places in Illinois
National Register of Historic Places in Cass County, Illinois